Sretenje Order is the fourth highest state order of Serbia.
The order is awarded by the decree of the President of Serbia on special occasions. It is awarded for merits in the fields of public, economic, cultural, educational, sports and humanitarian activities. It can be awarded to individuals and institutions.

Ranks
Sretenje Order has three classes.

Notable recipients

1st class
 2021 -  Emir Kusturica
 2016 -  Corfu municipality
 2013 -  Harold Pinter (posthumously)
 2013 -  Pierre Marie Gallois (posthumously)

2nd class
 2015 -  Noam Chomsky
 2014 -  Archive of Serbia
 2012 -  Ramsey Clark

3rd class
 2014 -  Zastava Arms
 2020 -  KUD Gradimir

See also 
 Orders, decorations and medals of Serbia

References

Awards established in 2009